María José Jiménez Gutiérrez (born 17 September 2000) is a Spanish professional footballer who plays as a defender for Liga F club Valencia CF.

Club career
Jiménez started her career at Sporting Plaza Argel B.

References

External links
Profile at La Liga

2000 births
Living people
Women's association football defenders
Spanish women's footballers
Footballers from Alicante
Sporting Plaza de Argel players
Levante UD Femenino players
Valencia CF Femenino players
Primera División (women) players
Segunda Federación (women) players
Spain women's youth international footballers
21st-century Spanish women